Thomas Patrick O'Toole II (May 14, 1913 – July 28, 1983) was an American professional basketball player. He played in the National Basketball League for the Hammond Ciesar All-Americans in one game during the 1940–41 season but did not score a point.

References 

1913 births
1983 deaths
American men's basketball players
Basketball players from Akron, Ohio
Centers (basketball)
Hammond Ciesar All-Americans players